Langona bethae is a jumping spider that lives in Botswana and Zimbabwe.

References

Salticidae
Spiders of Africa
Arthropods of Botswana
Arthropods of Zimbabwe
Spiders described in 2011
Taxa named by Wanda Wesołowska